Friends for Life ( also known as Amis pour la vie in France) is a 1955 Italian and French comedy-drama film directed by Franco Rossi. It was nominated for "Best Film" at the 10th British Academy Film Awards.

Plot 
Rome. Mario is a self-confident fourteen-year-old boy who is in eighth grade. One day a new pupil arrives in class, Franco, who is placed by the teacher in Mario's desk.

Mario is initially hostile towards the newcomer, who immediately proves to be an intelligent boy and soon enters the good graces of his classmates and professors. After some time, however, the two boys begin to meet and make friends.

Mario is the son of a ceramics entrepreneur, while Franco is the son of a diplomat, he lives in a hotel and drinks tomato juice for an aperitif.

While Mario shows confidence in approaching the girls, Franco is hesitant and only after a certain insistence on Mario's part is it discovered that the child has a person in his heart and also confides in him where he lives, exactly in a villa on the Via Appia, but he says also that he never sees her because he never leaves the house. He describes her as "Ingrid Bergman with black hair".

One day Mario decides not to go to school and intrigued by his friend's story, he goes to the villa to find out who this girl is. He will discover that the villa is Franco's old house, where his mother had died. Returning to his friend to talk to him about it, he initially reacts badly but then returns to his old house in the company of his friend and then bursts into a liberating cry. The two become friends so much that the decision is made that Franco will go and live with Mario's family, to have a somewhat stable life.

Then, on the other hand, the two boys participate in the national cross-country championships: during the races they find themselves against each other in the final.

The race is won by Franco: Mario, angry, tells his companions about Franco's mother, to whom he had sworn to keep the secret. Franco pretends to be physically ill to hide his deep disappointment with Mario, and then decides to leave with his father, never to return.

Cast
Geronimo Meynier ...  Mario
Andrea Sciré ...  Franco
Vera Carmi ...  La madre di Mario
Luigi Tosi ...  Il padre di Mario
Carlo Tamberlani ...  Il padre di Franco
Paolo Ferrara..  Professore Martinelli
Marcella Rovena ...  Professoressa di inglese
Leonilde Montesi ...  Professoressa di latino
Ignazio Leone ...  Professore di ginnastica
Maria Chiara Bettinali ...  Margherita
Isabella Nobili ...  Alunna
Renata Bousquet ...  Alunna
Roberto Illuminati ...  Alunno
Emilio Telve...  Alunno
Angelo Bizzoni ...  Alunno
Vittorio Casali ...  Alunno
Giancarlo Margheriti ...  Alunno
Giancarlo Tiburzi ...  Alunno

References

External links
 

1955 films
1955 comedy-drama films
Films scored by Nino Rota
1950s Italian-language films
Films directed by Franco Rossi
Films set in Rome
Italian black-and-white films
French black-and-white films
French comedy-drama films
Italian comedy-drama films
1950s Italian films
1950s French films